The meridian 118° east of Greenwich is a line of longitude that extends from the North Pole across the Arctic Ocean, Asia, the Indian Ocean, Australasia, the Southern Ocean, and Antarctica to the South Pole.

The 118th meridian east forms a great circle with the 62nd meridian west.

From Pole to Pole
Starting at the North Pole and heading south to the South Pole, the 118th meridian east passes through:

{| class="wikitable plainrowheaders"
! scope="col" width="130" | Co-ordinates
! scope="col" | Country, territory or sea
! scope="col" | Notes
|-
| style="background:#b0e0e6;" | 
! scope="row" style="background:#b0e0e6;" | Arctic Ocean
| style="background:#b0e0e6;" |
|-
| style="background:#b0e0e6;" | 
! scope="row" style="background:#b0e0e6;" | Laptev Sea
| style="background:#b0e0e6;" |
|-valign="top"
| 
! scope="row" | 
| Sakha Republic Irkutsk Oblast — from  Zabaykalsky Krai — from 
|-valign="top"
| 
! scope="row" | 
| Inner Mongolia
|-
| 
! scope="row" | 
|
|-valign="top"
| 
! scope="row" | 
| Inner Mongolia Hebei – for about 17 km from  Inner Mongolia – for about 4 km from  Hebei – from  Tianjin – from 
|-
| style="background:#b0e0e6;" | 
! scope="row" style="background:#b0e0e6;" | Bohai Sea
| style="background:#b0e0e6;" |
|-valign="top"
| 
! scope="row" | 
|-valign="top"
| style="background:#b0e0e6;" | 
! scope="row" style="background:#b0e0e6;" | South China Sea
| style="background:#b0e0e6;" | Passing just east of the disputed Scarborough Shoal (at )
|-
| 
! scope="row" | 
| Island of Palawan
|-
| style="background:#b0e0e6;" | 
! scope="row" style="background:#b0e0e6;" | Sulu Sea
| style="background:#b0e0e6;" |
|-
| 
! scope="row" | 
| Sabah – island of Borneo
|-
| style="background:#b0e0e6;" | 
! scope="row" style="background:#b0e0e6;" | Celebes Sea
| style="background:#b0e0e6;" |
|-
| 
! scope="row" | 
| East Kalimantan – island of Borneo
|-
| style="background:#b0e0e6;" | 
! scope="row" style="background:#b0e0e6;" | Celebes Sea
| style="background:#b0e0e6;" |
|-
| 
! scope="row" | 
| East Kalimantan – island of Borneo
|-
| style="background:#b0e0e6;" | 
! scope="row" style="background:#b0e0e6;" | Makassar Strait
| style="background:#b0e0e6;" |
|-
| style="background:#b0e0e6;" | 
! scope="row" style="background:#b0e0e6;" | Java Sea
| style="background:#b0e0e6;" | Passing by numerous small islands of 
|-
| style="background:#b0e0e6;" | 
! scope="row" style="background:#b0e0e6;" | Flores Sea
| style="background:#b0e0e6;" | Passing by numerous small islands of 
|-
| 
! scope="row" | 
| Island of Sumbawa
|-
| style="background:#b0e0e6;" | 
! scope="row" style="background:#b0e0e6;" | Indian Ocean
| style="background:#b0e0e6;" |
|-
| 
! scope="row" | 
| Western Australia
|-
| style="background:#b0e0e6;" | 
! scope="row" style="background:#b0e0e6;" | Indian Ocean
| style="background:#b0e0e6;" | Australian authorities consider this to be part of the Southern Ocean
|-
| style="background:#b0e0e6;" | 
! scope="row" style="background:#b0e0e6;" | Southern Ocean
| style="background:#b0e0e6;" |
|-
| 
! scope="row" | Antarctica
| Australian Antarctic Territory, claimed by 
|-
|}

See also
117th meridian east
119th meridian east

References

e118 meridian east